Desert Uniforms, Patches, and Insignia of the US Armed Forces is a comprehensive reference book that provides a detailed study of desert uniforms, patches, and insignia worn by the US Armed Forces in combat from Desert Storm, through Somalia, and in the campaigns of Iraq and Afghanistan.

Content

The book is a reference of desert combat uniforms, patches and insignia worn by the US Armed Forces in Desert Storm, Somalia, Iraq and Afghanistan. It covers information on US Army, Navy, Air Force, Marine Corps, and Coast Guard desert uniforms and patches. It is designed to provide a reference for veterans, historians, collectors and reenactors.

Reception

The March 2017 issue of the Military Trader Magazine stated that, "While the term 'bible' is thrown around rather loosely in our hobby 'definitive' retains its significance as an expression of honor and endorsement. I do not hesitate to say Desert Uniforms, Patches, and Insignia of the US Armed Forces by Born and Barns is the definitive volume for anyone who is collecting the shortest-lived - but some of the most distinctive uniforms in U.S. military history.  Not only is it a stand alone reference for the collectors and historian, it is also a tribute to the men and women of the US Armed Forces during this chaotic time in history."

The Trading Post, the quarterly journal of the American Society of Military Insignia Collectors described the book as, "a roadmap of those changes that will be an invaluable guide to the collector of uniforms and insignia from this somewhat unappreciated era in our military history,  I highly recommend it to anyone with even a passing interest in collecting militaria of the last thirty years or so."  

The Fort Lee Traveller Newspaper reported that, "In preparation for the book, they accumulated more than 1,000 government and theater-made desert patches and over 300 uniforms. A large number are in it. These came from numerous veterans and collectors..." Born said, “writing the book was about two things for us – recognizing the service and sacrifice of the men and women of the armed forces who wore the desert uniform as well as advancing this area of military collecting. Whenever a reference like this is published, there is an increased interest among collectors.”

References

 Veterans explore U.S. military desert uniforms in new book
 Lee employee, retiree explore U.S. military desert uniforms in book
 Worldcat
 Open Library
 Library of Congress

External links
 Schiffer Books
 Facebook Page
 Facebook Group

United States Army uniforms
United States Army shoulder
Military camouflage
United States military uniforms
History of fashion